Mps one binder kinase activator-like 1A, also known as Mob1 homolog 1A, is a protein that in humans is encoded by the MOBKL1A gene.

Function 

The protein encoded by this gene is similar to the yeast Mob1 protein. Yeast Mob1 binds Mps1p, a protein kinase essential for spindle pole body duplication and mitotic checkpoint regulation.

See also 
 Hippo signaling pathway

References

Further reading